In the mathematical field of graph theory, a  vertex-transitive graph is a graph  in which, given any two vertices  and  of , there is some automorphism

such that

In other words, a graph is vertex-transitive if its automorphism group acts transitively on its vertices. A graph is vertex-transitive if and only if its graph complement is, since the group actions are identical.

Every symmetric graph without isolated vertices is vertex-transitive, and every vertex-transitive graph is regular. However, not all vertex-transitive graphs are symmetric (for example, the edges of the truncated tetrahedron), and not all regular graphs are vertex-transitive (for example, the Frucht graph and Tietze's graph).

Finite examples 

Finite vertex-transitive graphs include the symmetric graphs (such as the Petersen graph, the Heawood graph and the vertices and edges of the Platonic solids).  The finite Cayley graphs (such as cube-connected cycles) are also vertex-transitive, as are the vertices and edges of the Archimedean solids (though only two of these are symmetric). Potočnik, Spiga and Verret have constructed a census of all connected cubic vertex-transitive graphs on at most 1280 vertices.

Although every Cayley graph is vertex-transitive, there exist other vertex-transitive graphs that are not Cayley graphs. The most famous example is the Petersen graph, but others can be constructed including the line graphs of edge-transitive non-bipartite graphs with odd vertex degrees.

Properties 
The edge-connectivity of a vertex-transitive graph is equal to the degree d, while the vertex-connectivity will be at least 2(d + 1)/3.
If the degree is 4 or less, or the graph is also edge-transitive, or the graph is a minimal Cayley graph, then the vertex-connectivity will also be equal to d.

Infinite examples 
Infinite vertex-transitive graphs include:
 infinite paths (infinite in both directions)
 infinite regular trees, e.g. the Cayley graph of the free group
 graphs of uniform tessellations (see a complete list of planar tessellations), including all tilings by regular polygons
 infinite Cayley graphs
 the Rado graph

Two countable vertex-transitive graphs are called quasi-isometric if the ratio of their distance functions is bounded from below and from above.  A well known conjecture stated that every infinite vertex-transitive graph is quasi-isometric to a Cayley graph.  A counterexample was proposed by Diestel and Leader in 2001.  In 2005, Eskin, Fisher, and Whyte confirmed the counterexample.

See also 
 Edge-transitive graph
 Lovász conjecture
 Semi-symmetric graph
 Zero-symmetric graph

References

External links 
 
A census of small connected cubic vertex-transitive graphs . Primož Potočnik, Pablo Spiga, Gabriel Verret, 2012.

Graph families
Algebraic graph theory
Regular graphs